Russell Dickerson is the third album by American country music singer Russell Dickerson. It was released November 4, 2022 via Thirty Tigers.

Content
The album includes the lead single "She Likes It", a duet with Jake Scott. Dickerson had discovered Scott online and encouraged him to join a songwriting session, which also led to him providing vocals on the track.

Dickerson co-wrote every song on the album and co-produced with Dann Huff, Zach Crowell, Casey Brown, Josh Kerr, Ben Johnson, and Alysa Vanderheym. He told Marcus K. Dowling of The Tennessean that individual tracks were inspired by the birth of his child and seeing his wife, Kailey, sing to her. Other tracks were inspired by "quiet moments" the couple had during the COVID-19 pandemic. The couple's infant son, Remington, can be heard at the end of the track "Just Like Your Mama".

Critical reception
An uncredited review in AllMusic rated the album three out of five stars, stating that "adopts a more reflective, though no less amiable tone than its predecessor."

Track listing
 "Blame It on Being Young" (Russell Dickerson, Josh Kerr, Parker Welling) – 3:05
 "Sorry" (Dickerson, Hunter Phelps, Ashley Gorley, Ben Johnson) – 3:09
 "She Likes It" (Dickerson, Jake Scott, Josh Kerr) – 2:44
featuring Jake Scott
 "I Still Believe" (Dickerson, Welling, Matt Jenkins, Zach Crowell) – 3:19
 "Big Wheels" (Dickerson, Gorley, Hunter Phelps, Johnson) – 2:10
 "I Remember" (Dickerson, Alysa Vanderheym, Chris Ryan, Logan Turner, Matt McGinn) – 3:06
 "I Wonder" (Dickerson, Jon Nite, Casey Brown) – 3:27
 "God Gave Me a Girl" (Dickerson, Gorley, Chase McGill, Crowell) – 3:08
 "All the Same Friends" (Dickerson, Gorley, McGill, Crowell) – 2:55
 "Beers to the Summer" (Dickerson, Jenkins, Mark Holman) – 3:18
 "She's Why" (Dickerson, Kerr, Sean Douglas) – 2:58
 "18" (Dickerson, Kerr, Gorley, Illsey Juber) – 3:14
 "Over and Over" (Dickerson, Kerr, Welling, Jordan Reynolds) – 2:21
 "Drink to This" (Dickerson, Crowell, Gorley, Welling) – 5:12
 "Just Like Your Mama" (Dickerson, Brown, Lori McKenna) – 4:48

Personnel
Adapted from liner notes.

Casey Brown – background vocals (2, 4, 7, 14, 15)
Natalie Brown – background vocals (2, 4, 7, 14, 15)
Ben Caver – background vocals (8–10)
Lauren Conklin – fiddle (5)
Zach Crowell – keyboards (8–10), programming (8–10), background vocals (9)
Russell Dickerson – lead vocals (all tracks), background vocals (11, 12)
Kris Donegan – electric guitar (1, 8–13)
Jeneé Fleenor – fiddle (2)
Paul Franklin – steel guitar (6, 7, 14, 15)
Mark Holman – keyboards (10), programming (10)
David Huff – programming (2, 4, 6, 7, 14, 15)
Evan Hutchings – drums (1, 11–13)
Ben Johnson – guitars (5), keyboards (5), programming (5), background vocals (5)
Illsey Juber – background vocals (12)
Charlie Judge – keyboards (2, 4, 6, 7, 14, 15)
Hannah Kerr – background vocals (13)
Josh Kerr – acoustic guitar (1, 13), electric guitar (11, 12), guitars (3), keyboards (3), programming (1, 11–13), synthesizer (3, 11, 12), background vocals (1, 12, 13)
Tony Lucido – bass guitar (1, 11–13)
Devin Malone – acoustic guitar (9), electric guitar (9, 10)
Chase McGill – electric guitar (8, 9)
Chris McHugh – drums (8–10)
Rob McNelley – electric guitar (4, 7, 14, 15)
Sol Philcox-Littlefield – electric guitar (8–10)
Josh Reedy – background vocals (2, 4, 7, 14, 15)
Jordan Reynolds – acoustic guitar (13)
Jerry Roe – drums (2, 6, 7, 14, 15)
Jake Scott – bass guitar (3), keyboards (3), synthesizer (3), duet vocals (3)
Jimmie Lee Sloas – bass guitar (2, 4, 6–10, 14, 15)
Aaron Sterling – drums (4)
Ilya Toshinsky – acoustic guitar (2, 4, 6–10, 14, 15), banjo (9)
Derek Wells – electric guitar (2, 6)
Alex Wright – piano (1, 11–13), synthesizer (1, 11–13)

Chart performance

References

2022 albums
Russell Dickerson albums
Thirty Tigers albums